To be included in this list, the person must have a Wikipedia article showing they are Italian American actors or must have references showing they are Italian American actors and are notable.  As discussed in the 2005 book Hollywood Italians by Peter E. Bondanella, as well as numerous other sources, Italian-American actors have made a significant impact. The Guild of Italian American Actors was founded in 1937.

Background
Some Italian-American film directors of the silent film era included Robert Vignola, Gregory LaCava, Frank Borzage (Borzaga) and Frank Capra. Italian-American actors included Enrico Caruso in the cultural legitimation of American silent cinema, to Rudolph (Rodolfo) Valentino.

The of American film Renaissance (New Hollywood) in the 1970s coincided with Scorsese’s Mean Streets (1973) and Coppola’s The Godfather (1972), Giuliana Muscio attributes this to Italian Americans becoming better educated and more affluent after World War II.

Such director-actors include: Danny DeVito, John Turturro, Steve Buscemi, Vincent Gallo, Al Pacino, Stanley Tucci, Robert De Niro, Sylvester Stallone, Gary Sinise, Anne Bancroft, and Madonna.

List
The list is organized chronologically, listing Italian American actors by birth date periods.

1870s
Agostino Borgato (1871–1939) actor and director

1880s
Henry Armetta (1888–1945) movie character actor – of Italian heritage
William Edmunds (Michele Giuseppe Pellegrino) (1886-1981) stage and screen character actor (Double Dynamite)
Giuseppina Morlacchi (1846–1886) ballerina and dancer, performing in western drama including Scouts of the Prairie and Buffalo Bill's Wild West
Rafaela Ottiano (1888–1942) stage and film actress
Robert G. Vignola (1882–1953) actor, screenwriter and film director

1890s
Frank Capra (1897–1991) a Sicilian born actor and director (It's a Wonderful Life)
Gino Corrado (1893–1982) actor
Jimmy Durante (1893–1980) actor and singer
Frank Puglia (Francesco Giuseppe Puglia) (1892-1975) actor (Casablanca)
Rudolph Valentino (1895–1926) born Rodolfo Alfonso Rafaello Piero Filiberto Gugliemi di Valentina, Hollywood's first sex symbol and the first "Latin lover" (Italian father, Giovanni Antonio Giuseppe Fedele Guglielmi di Valentina D'Antonguolla, and French mother, Marie Berta Gabrielle Barbin; Valentino was born in Italy)
Tito Vuolo (1893-1962) actor (Cry of the City)

1900s
Don Ameche (Amici) (1908–1993) 50% Italian, actor and director
Argentina Brunetti (1907–2005) actress (It's a Wonderful Life)
Iron Eyes Cody (Espera Decorti) (1907–1999) son of Sicilian parents – actor, frequently played Native Americans
Jerry Colonna (1904–1986) actor, entertainer, musician
Russ Columbo (1908–1934) singer, violinist and actor, perhaps most famous for his signature tune, "You Call It Madness, But I Call It Love", and the legend surrounding his early death
Lou Costello (Cristillo) (1906–1959) 62.5% Italian, 25% Irish, and 12.5% French blood – actor and comedian known as half of the comedy team of Abbott and Costello
Angelo Rossitto (1908–1991), actor and voice artist
Renata Vanni (1909–2004) Italian-born American film actress

1910s
Robert Alda (Alfonso Roberto D'Abruzzo) (1914–1986) actor, father of Alan Alda
Miriam Battista (1912–1980) daughter of Italian immigrants – child actress of the silent film era
John Beradino (1917–1996) Dr. Steve Hardy on the soap opera General Hospital from 1963 to 1996, star on Hollywood walk-of-fame
Ernest Borgnine (Borgnino) (1917–2012) Academy Award-winning actor
Frank Campanella (1919–2006) son of Sicilian parents – actor
Anthony Caruso (1916–2003) film/television actor
Adriana Caselotti (1916–1997) actress known for providing the voice behind the lead character in Walt Disney's Snow White and the Seven Dwarfs
Richard Conte (1910–1975) film actor
Ann Corio (1914–1999) burlesque ecdysiast and actress
Dean Martin (Crocetti) (1917–1995) actor/singer, member of the Rat Pack
Victor Mature (1913–1999) was an American film actor. Mature was born in Louisville, Kentucky to a Tyrolean father, Marcellus George Mature, a cutler, and a Swiss-American mother, Clara Mature
Al Molinaro (1919–2015) son of Italian parents – actor (The Odd Couple, Happy Days)
Frank Sinatra (1915–1998) his parents' Italian heritage included a Sicilian father and a mother from Liguria in northern Italy- actor and singer who many consider to be one of the finest male popular song vocalists of all time

1920s
Kaye Ballard (Balotta) (1925–2019) stage and television actress
Billy Barty (Bertanzetti) (1924–2000) film actor
Tony Bennett (Benedetto) (born 1926) popular music, standards, jazz singer and actor (The Oscar)
Joseph Campanella (1924–2018) actor
Timothy Carey (Agoglia) (1929–1994) Irish father and Italian mother – film and television character actor (Peeper)
Teresa Celli (Teresa Mara Levis) (1923-1999) daughter of Italian parents - actress (Black Hand)
Nicholas Colasanto (1924-1985) of Italian descent - actor (Family Plot)
Jackie Cooper (John Cooper Jr.) (1922-2011) mother of Italian ancestry - actor (Skippy)
Pat Cooper (Pasquale Caputo) (born 1929) film actor and comedian
Richard Crenna (1926–2003) film actor (First Blood)
Cesare Danova (1926–1992) 75% Italian and 25% Swiss – film actor (Cleopatra)
Yvonne De Carlo (Margaret Yvonne Middleton) (1922–2007) 25% Italian
Linda Douglas (Mary Joanne Tarola) (1928–2017) her mother was a native of Alaska, born to Swedish immigrants, while her father was originally from Italy.
Vince Edwards (Zoine) (1928–1996) actor, director, and singer
Sergio Franchi (1926–1990) Italian-born film, television and theatre actor, musician and singer
Anthony Franciosa (Papaleo) (1928–2006) film/television actor, often billed as "Tony Franciosa"
Vincent Gardenia (Scognamiglia) (1922–1992) stage, film, and television actor
Michael V. Gazzo (1923–1995) actor and Broadway playwright
Harry Guardino (1925–1995) actor
Mario Lanza (Alfredo Cocozza) (1921–1959) tenor and Hollywood movie star who enjoyed success in the late 1940s and 1950s
Al Lettieri (1928–1975) film/television actor (The Godfather)
Guy Marks (1923–1987) (Mario Scarpa) actor, comedian, singer and impressionist
Al Martino (1927–2009) son of Sicilian parents – actor and singer (The Godfather)
Lenny Montana (Passafaro) (1926–1992) wrestler turned film and television actor who featured in several films and TV shows in the 1970s and early 1980s
Felice Orlandi (1925-2003) actor (Killer's Kiss)
Paul Picerni (1922–2011) film actor (To Hell and Back)
Aldo Ray (Da Re) (1926–1991) actor
Tom Rosqui (1928–1991) Italian father and Portuguese mother – actor (The Godfather)
Johnny Seven (John Anthony Fetto, II) (1926-2010) son of Italian immigrants - actor (Cop Hater)
Henry Silva (1926–2022) actor of Sicilian and Spanish descent
Dick Van Patten (1928–2015) mother of Italian ancestry – TV actor
Jackie Vernon (Ralph Verrone) (1924–1987) stand-up comedian, cartoon voice of Frosty the Snowman
Fritz Weaver (1926-2016) mother of Italian ancestry - actor (Creepshow)
Guy Williams (Armando Catalano) (1924–1989) son of Sicilian parents – film actor

1930s
Anna Maria Alberghetti (born 1936) actress and soprano (Ten Thousand Bedrooms)
F. Murray Abraham (born 1939) Oscar-winner for Best Actor – mother of Italian descent
Danny Aiello (1933–2019) film/television actor
Alan Alda (born 1936) actor, writer, director and political activist – father of Italian descent
Frankie Avalon (Avallone) (born 1939) actor and teen idol in the 1950s and early 1960s
Anne Bancroft (Italiano) (1931–2005) Academy Award-winning actress
Robert Blake (Gubitosi) (born 1933) film actor, perhaps most famous for starring in the U.S. television series Baretta, and for being found not guilty of the murder of wife Bonnie Lee Bakley
Joseph Bologna (1934–2017) film/television actor
Sonny Bono (1935–1998) son of Sicilian parents – actor and pop singer (Airplane II)
Philip Bosco (1930-2018) father of Italian descent - actor (Suspect)
Julie Bovasso (Julia Anne Bovasso) (1930-1991) daughter of Italian parents - actress (Wise Guys)
Victor Buono (1938–1982) Italian father and German mother – film and television actor, poet
Ruth Buzzi (born 1936),  actress, comedian, and singer 
Ron Carey (Cicenia) (1935–2007) film and television actor (Barney Miller)
Carmine Caridi (1934–2019) film actor (The Godfather Part III)
Richard S. Castellano (1933–1988) film actor (The Godfather)
John Cazale (1935–1978) film actor (The Godfather)   – father of Italian descent
Dominic Chianese (born 1931) television actor (The Sopranos)
Sam Coppola (1932–2012) film/television actor
 Mary Costa (born 1930) American singer and actress, who is best known for providing the voice of Princess Aurora in the 1959 film, Sleeping Beauty.
Bobby Darin (Cassoto) (1936–1973) actor, singer and one of the most popular rock and roll American teen idols of the 1950s – maternal grandfather was of Italian ancestry, unclear who Darin's biological father was
Tony Darrow (Borgese) (born 1938) film/television actor
James Darren (Ercolani) (born 1936) television and film actor, television director, and singer
Dom DeLuise (1933–2009) comic actor
Connie Francis (Franconero) (born 1938) actress and pop singer, known for her 1957 hit "Who's Sorry Now?"
Ben Gazzara (1930–2012) son of Sicilian parents, film/television actor
Joan Hackett (1934–1983) American actress of stage, television and film. Nominated for an Oscar for Best Supporting Actress in 1981, Italian mother
Morgana King (1930–2018) (Maria Grazia Morgana Messina DeBerardini) daughter of Sicilian parents – film actress (The Godfather)
Frank Langella (born 1938) stage, film and television actor
Richard Libertini (1933–2016) stage, film and television actor known for playing numerous character roles (Popeye)
Tony Lo Bianco (born 1936) film and television actor (The French Connection)
Robert Loggia (1930–2015) son of Sicilian parents – film actor
Garry Marshall (Masciarelli) (1934–2016) Italian-American father and part Scottish mother—actor, director, and writer – brother of Penny Marshall
Micole Mercurio (1938–2016) film and television actress 
Sal Mineo (1939–1976) son of Sicilian parents – actor and theater director, famous for his Academy Award-nominated performance opposite James Dean in Rebel Without a Cause
Tony Musante (1936–2013) stage, television, and film actor
Ann Prentiss (Ragusa) (1939–2010) film/television actress – sister of Paula Prentiss, father of Italian ancestry
Paula Prentiss (Ragusa) (born 1938) film actress – father of Italian ancestry
Burt Reynolds (1936-2018) of Dutch, English, Scots-Irish, Scottish, Cherokee, Italian descent - film actor (Boogie Nights)
Alex Rocco (Petricone) (1936–2015) film actor (The Godfather)
John Saxon (Orrico) (1936–2020) film actor
Gia Scala (1934–1972) film actress and model
Tina Scala (1935-2022) film actress, model and poet
Paul Sorvino (1939–2022) actor, father of Mira Sorvino
Joe Spinell (Spagnuolo) (1936–1989) film actor (The Godfather II)
Connie Stevens (Ingolia) (born 1938) Italian father and Irish mother – actress and singer
Marlo Thomas (born 1937) Lebanese father and Italian mother
Brenda Vaccaro (born 1939) film and television actress
Frankie Valli (Castelluccio) (born 1934) singer and actor (The Sopranos)
Frank Vincent (Gattuso) (1937–2017) film/television actor (The Sopranos)
Joe Viterelli (1937–2004) film actor (Shallow Hal)

1940s
Marc Alaimo (born 1942) television/film actor (Star Trek: Deep Space Nine)
Carmen Argenziano (1943–2019) TV and film actor
Armand Assante (born 1949) Italian father and Irish mother   – film/television actor (Mambo Kings)
Paul Barresi (born 1949) stage, film and television actor and model famously known for his natural muscled physic and film persona
Toni Basil (born 1943) born Antonia Christina Basilotta, of Italian descent - dancer, actress, singer (Five Easy Pieces)
Joy Behar (Josephina Ochiuto) (born 1943) actress, comedian, co-host of The View
Marisa Berenson (Vittoria Marisa Schiaparelli Berenson) (born 1947) actress and model
Linda Bove (born 1945) deaf actress who requires sign language (Sesame Street)
Robert De Niro (born 1943) 25% Italian ancestry   – two time Academy Award-winning American film actor, director, producer and founder of the Tribeca Film Festival (Goodfellas)
Danny DeVito (born 1944) actor, director, Oscar nominated producer (Matilda)
Dennis Farina (1944–2013) son of Sicilian parents   – film/television actor (Get Shorty)
Robert Forster (1941-2019) mother of Italian descent and father of English and Irish descent - actor (Jackie Brown)
Annette Funicello (1942–2013) actress, was Walt Disney's most popular Mouseketeer
Bruno Kirby (Quidaciolu) (1949–2006) son of Sicilian parents   – film actor (The Godfather Part II)
Adrienne La Russa (born 1948) actress (Days of our lives)
Dan Lauria (born 1947) TV and film actor
Susan Lucci (born 1946) 50% Italian and part Swedish - Daytime Emmy Award-winning actress, who has been called "Daytime's Leading Lady" and "The Queen of Daytime"
Patti LuPone (born 1949) singer and actress
Joe Mantegna (born 1947) film/television actor (The Godfather Part III)
Penny Marshall (Masciarelli) (1943–2018) Italian-American father and part Scottish mother   – actress, producer and director, sister of Garry Marshall
Patty McCormack, born Patricia Ellen Russo (born 1945), Italian father and Irish mother – actress (The Bad Seed)
Liza Minnelli (born 1946) great-grandfather of Italian ancestry   – singer and actress
Arthur Nascarella (born 1942) son of Sicilian parents   – film/ television actor (The Sopranos)
Don Novello (born 1943) Italian father and Irish mother   – film/television actor and comedian (Saturday Night Live)  
Al Pacino (born 1940) son of Sicilian parents   – Academy Award-winning film actor (The Godfather)
Vincent Pastore (born 1946) son of Sicilian parents  – film/television actor, often cast as a mobster (The Sopranos)
Frank Pellegrino (1944–2017) television actor
Joe Pesci (born 1943) Academy Award-winning actor, comedian and singer who is often typecast as a violent mobster or funnyman (Goodfellas, Casino)
Bernadette Peters (Lazzara) (born 1948) actress and singer
Joseph Pilato (1949-2019) son of Italian parents - film and voice actor (Day of the Dead)
Michael Richards (born 1949) mother of Italian ancestry   – television actor (Seinfeld)
Tommy Rettig (1941–1996) Italian-American mother and Jewish father   – television actor (Lassie)
 Leo Rossi (born 1946) Italian-American actor, writer and producer
Susan Sarandon (born 1946) mother of Italian ancestry   – Academy Award-winning film actress (Thelma and Louise)
Vincent Schiavelli (1948–2005) film actor
Talia Shire (born 1946) film actress, sister of Francis Ford Coppola (Rocky)
Nancy Sinatra (born 1940) singer and actress, daughter of Frank Sinatra
Tony Sirico (1942-2022) son of Sicilian parents   – film/television actor (The Sopranos)
Bruce Springsteen (born 1949) 50% Italian, 25% Irish and part Dutch   – singer and actor
Sylvester Stallone (born 1946) film actor, director, producer, and screenwriter (Rocky), father of Italian immigrant
 Daniel J. Travanti (born 1940) son of Italian immigrants – film/television actor (Hill Street Blues)
Victoria Vetri (born 1944) model and actress
Burt Young (Morea) (born 1940) film actor (Rocky)
Tom Savini (born 1946) actor, prosthetic makeup artist, director

1950s 
Ray Abruzzo (born 1954) television actor (The Sopranos)
Sharon Angela (born 1958) television actress (The Sopranos)
Michael Badalucco (born 1954) film actor (O Brother, Where Art Thou?)
Danny Bonaduce (born 1959) Italian father   – television actor (The Partridge Family)
Elizabeth Bracco (born 1959) Italian father and mother of French descent   – television actress (The Sopranos)
Lorraine Bracco (born 1954) Italian father and mother of French descent   – Academy Award-nominated actress (The Sopranos, Goodfellas)
Steve Buscemi (born 1957) Italian father and part Irish mother   – actor (Fargo, Reservoir Dogs)
Joseph Cali (born 1950) film actor (Saturday Night Fever)
Carl Capotorto (born 1959) television actor (The Sopranos)
David Caruso (born 1956) Italian father and Irish mother   – film/television actor (CSI: Miami)
Dennis Christopher (Carrelli) (born 1955) Italian father and Irish mother - actor (Django Unchained)
Vincent Curatola (born 1953) television actor (The Sopranos)
Beverly D'Angelo (born 1951) father of Italian descent   – film actress (Vacation)
Tony Danza (born 1951) actor/talk show host (Who's The Boss, Family Law)
Robert Davi (born 1951) film actor (The Goonies)
Michael DeLorenzo (born 1959) Italian father and Puerto Rican mother   – television/film actor (New York Undercover)
Vincent D'Onofrio (born 1959) son of Sicilian parents – film/television actor and director (Full Metal Jacket, Law and Order: Criminal Intent)
Giancarlo Esposito (born 1958) Italian father and African-American mother   – film actor
Cristina Ferrare (born 1950) actress of Italian descent (The Impossible Years)
Lou Ferrigno (born 1951) bodybuilder and actor (The Hulk)
William Forsythe (born 1955) of partial Italian descent - actor (Out for Justice)
Robert Funaro (born 1959) television actor (The Sopranos)
Joseph Gannascoli (born 1959) television actor (The Sopranos)
Dan Grimaldi (born 1950) television actor (The Sopranos)
Robert Hegyes (1951–2012) television actor (Welcome Back, Kotter) Italian-American mother, Hungarian-American father
Kathy Hilton (born 1959) Italian grandfather – actress (Happy Days)
Hulk Hogan (Terry Gino Bollea) (born 1953) 50% Italian wrestler
Anjelica Huston (born 1951) mother of Italian descent and father of English, Irish, and Scottish descent   – film actress (Prizzi's Honor)
Renée Jones (born 1958) Italian mother and African-American father   – soap opera actress (Days of our Lives)
Matt Lattanzi (born 1959) Italian father and Polish mother   – actor and dancer (My Tutor)
Cyndi Lauper (born 1953) Italian mother and Swiss/German father   – singer and actress- (Girls Just Wanna Have Fun)
Jay Leno (born 1950) Italian-American father and Scottish mother   – comedian, former actor, known as host of The Tonight Show
Joe Lisi (born 1950) father of Italian descent and mother of Irish descent - television actor (Marvin's Room)
Madonna (Ciccone) (born 1958) father of Italian ancestry and mother of French-Canadian ancestry – singer, songwriter, dancer, actress, entertainer (A League of Their Own, Dick Tracy)
Ed Marinaro (born 1950) actor and former football player
Peter Onorati (born 1953)  Italian mother and father
Chazz Palminteri (born 1952) film actor (A Bronx Tale)
Joe Pantoliano (born 1951) film/television actor (The Sopranos)
Joe Penny (born 1956) Italian mother and English father  – television actor
Robert Picardo (Alphonse) (born 1953) son of Italian parents - actor (976-EVIL)
Mitch Pileggi (born 1952), actor of Italian parents. He played Horace Pinker in Shocker, Walter Skinner on The X-Files, Colonel Steven Caldwell on Stargate Atlantis
Bronson Pinchot (born 1959) mother of Italian ancestry – actor (Perfect Strangers)
Joe Piscopo (born 1951) actor and comedian (Saturday Night Live)
Jon Polito (1950–2016) Italian father and Anglo-American mother   – actor (The Honeymooners)
Victoria Principal (born 1950) father of Italian descent – actress (Dallas)
Suzi Quatro (born 1950) Italian paternal grandfather
Ray Romano (born 1957) actor and comedian (Everybody Loves Raymond)
Isabella Rossellini (born 1952) Italian father and Swedish mother – actress, filmmaker, author, philanthropist, model
James Russo (born 1953) film/television actor (Donnie Brasco)
Rene Russo (born 1954) Italian father and Italian maternal grandfather   – film actress/model (Lethal Weapon 3, The Thomas Crown Affair)
Randy Savage (Randall Mario Poffo) (1952–2011) Italian father and Jewish mother   – wrestler and actor
Jack Scalia (born 1950) film/television actor (The Genius Club)
Steve Schirripa (born 1957) television actor and writer (The Sopranos)   – father of Italian descent, and mother of Jewish descent
Connie Sellecca (Sellecchia) (born 1955) actress
Ray Sharkey (1952-1993) of Italian and Irish descent - actor (Love and Money)
Gary Sinise (born 1955) 25% Italian ancestry   – actor (CSI: NY)
Joseph Siravo (1955–2021) film/television actor (The Sopranos)
Rocco Sisto (born 1953) Italian-born actor (The Sopranos)
Frank Sivero (Lo Giudice) (born 1952) Italian-born actor (Goodfellas)
John Travolta (born 1954) Italian-American father and Irish-American mother   – Academy Award-nominated actor, singer, dancer (Grease, Saturday Night Fever)
John Turturro (born 1957) actor, cousin of Aida Turturro (The Good Shepherd, The Bronx Is Burning)
Steven Van Zandt (Lento) (born 1950) musician, songwriter, arranger, record producer, actor, and disc jockey (The Sopranos)
Vinny Vella (1947–2019) actor and part time comedian
Diane Venora (born 1952) actress (Italian-American father)
Pia Zadora (born 1954) Broadway actress   – Italian father, Polish mother
Chuck Zito (born 1953) member of the New York chapter of the Hells Angels, amateur boxer, martial artist, celebrity bodyguard, stuntman and actor

1960s
Kristian Alfonso (born 1964) soap opera actress, Days of Our Lives
Jennifer Aniston (born 1969) Italian maternal grandfather (Friends)
Joseph Badalucco Jr. (born 1960) television actor, brother of Michael Badalucco (The Sopranos)
Scott Baio (born 1961) television actor (Happy Days, Charles In Charge)
Matt Battaglia (born 1965) Italian father and Anglo-American mother – actor
Maria Bello (born 1967) Italian father and Polish mother   – Academy Award-nominated film actress
Michael Bergin (born 1969) Italian and Irish   – television and movie actor and model
Valerie Bertinelli (born 1960) Italian father and British-American mother – actress (One Day At A Time)
Lory Bianco (born 1963) singer and actress
Traci Bingham (born 1968) 25% Italian, 25% Black-American and 50% American Indian   – actress and model
Jon Bon Jovi (Bongiovi) (born 1962) of Sicilian, Slovak, German, Russian ancestry   – singer and film actor
David Boreanaz (born 1969) Italian father and part Slovak mother   – television actor (Buffy The Vampire Slayer, Angel)
Nicolas Cage (Coppola) (born 1964) Italian father and part German mother   – 5 Academy Award-winning actor, director, and producer
Christy Canyon (born 1966) Armenian-Italian descent — adult actress
Steve Carell (Caroselli) (born 1962) paternal grandfather of Italian ancestry   – film actor (The 40-Year-Old Virgin)
Adam Carolla (born 1964) of half Italian ancestry, comedian   – actor and host of the Adam Carolla Show
Max Casella (Deitch) (born 1967) Italian mother and Jewish father   – film/television actor (The Sopranos)
Federico Castelluccio (born 1964) Italian-born actor (The Sopranos)
Michael Cerveris (born 1960) Italian father
Damian Chapa (born 1963) mother is of Italian and German ancestry
Alicia Coppola (born 1968) actress
Roman Coppola (born 1965) Italian-American father   – film actor, son of Francis Ford Coppola
Dan Cortese (born 1967) son of Sicilian parents   – television actor
Lee Curreri (born 1961) actor, music composer and singer
Michael DeLuise (born 1969) Italian father and Italian-German mother   – film actor (Encino Man)
Peter DeLuise (born 1966) Italian father and Italian-German mother   – television actor (21 Jump Street)
Donna D'Errico (born 1968) Italian father and British-American mother – actress and model
John DiMaggio (born 1968) actor, voice actor, and comedian, known for his gruff voice
John Di Domenico (born 1962)  actor, comedian and writer
Illeana Douglas (born 1965) mother of Italian ancestry – film actress
Edie Falco (born 1963) Italian father and Swedish/English mother   – actress (The Sopranos)
Diane Farr (born 1969) of Italian and Irish descent – actress (Numb3rs)
Jon Favreau (born 1966) mostly Italian and some French-Canadian father, and Jewish mother   – actor and director (Rocky Marciano)
Sherilyn Fenn (born 1965) Italian great-grandfather
Adam Ferrara (born 1966) television actor and comedian
Linda Fiorentino (born 1960) film actress (The Last Seduction)
Joely Fisher (born 1967) Italian grandfather – film/television actress, daughter of Connie Stevens
Tricia Leigh Fisher (born 1968) Italian grandfather – film/television actress, daughter of Connie Stevens
Matthew Fox (born 1966) maternal grandfather was of Italian descent   – actor (Lost)
Vincent Gallo (born 1961) independent film actor and director (Goodfellas)
James Gandolfini (1961–2013) film/television actor (The Sopranos)
Janeane Garofalo (born 1964) Italian father and Irish mother   – stand-up comedian, actress, and political activist
Paul Giamatti (born 1967) paternal grandfather of Italian ancestry   – Academy Award-nominated film actor
Richard Grieco (born 1965) Italian father and Irish mother - actor (Mobsters)
Frank Grillo (born 1963) of Italian heritage
Brian Haley (born 1963) Italian-Irish father - stand-up comedian, actor
Anthony Michael Hall (born 1968) 25% Italian, 75% Irish – film/television actor, former teen star
Carlo Imperato (born 1963) is an Italian-American actor, best known for his role as student Danny Amatullo in the 1982 Fame TV series
Michael Imperioli (born 1966) film/television actor (The Sopranos)
Eddie Jemison (born 1963) film and television actor (Ocean's Eleven)
Ashley Judd (Ciminella) (born 1968) Italian-American paternal grandfather – film actor
Michael Kelly (born 1968) mother is of Italian descent (Criminal Minds)
Artie Lange (born 1967) 50% Italian, 25% German and 25% Native American – film/television actor, stand-up comedian and radio personality
Matt LeBlanc (born 1967) Italian mother – television actor (Friends)
John Leguizamo (born 1964) Italian, Puerto Rican, and Colombian descent – actor (Ice Age)
Téa Leoni (Pantaleoni) (born 1966) Italian great-great-grandfather – actress
Louis Lombardi (born 1968) film/television actor (The Sopranos)
Ralph Macchio (born 1961) father of Italian and Greek descent, mother of Italian ancestry – film actor (The Karate Kid)
Max Martini (born 1969) Italian father
Dylan McDermott (born 1961) mother of Italian and English descent, and father of Irish ancestry – film/television actor (The Practice)
Tim McGraw (born 1967) 25% Italian blood – actor and country music singer
Christopher Meloni (born 1961) Italian father and French Canadian mother – television actor (Law & Order: Special Victims Unit, Oz)
Sofia Milos (born 1965) Italian father and a Greek mother – actress
Kathrine Narducci (born 1965) film/television actress (The Sopranos)
Danny Nucci (born 1968) Italian father and Moroccan Jewish mother – film actor (Crimson Tide)
Erik Palladino (born 1968) Italian father and Armenian mother – actor (ER)
Mark Pellegrino (born 1965) actor of film and television
Sean Penn (born 1960) actor, director, screenwriter and producer
Maria Pitillo (born 1966) of Italian and Irish descent - actress (True Romance)
Teri Polo (born 1969) film and TV series actress
Ellen Pompeo (born 1969) paternal grandfather was Italian (Grey's Anatomy)
Francesco Quinn (Daniele) (1963-2011) mother of Italian ancestry - actor (Hell Ride)
Natalie Raitano (born 1966) television actress (V.I.P.)
Norman Reedus (born 1969) Italian grandmother
Salli Richardson (born 1967) Black-American/American-Indian mother and part Italian father
Lisa Rinna (born 1963) television actress
Michael Rispoli (born 1960) actor (The Sopranos)
Larry Romano (born 1963) of partial Italian descent – television actor and comedian (The King of Queens)
Mark Ruffalo (born 1967) Italian father and half French-Canadian, half Italian mother – critically acclaimed film actor,  (Just Like Heaven, 13 Going On 30)
Laura San Giacomo (born 1962) actress (Just Shoot Me)
Nick Sandow (born 1966) of Italian descent - actor, writer, producer and director (Swimfan)
Al Sapienza (born 1962) actor (The Sopranos)
Mia Sara (born 1967) actress (Legend)
Glenn Scarpelli (born 1966) Italian American – actor ("One Day At A Time")
Annabella Sciorra (born 1964) film/television actress (Jungle Fever)
Nick Scotti (born 1966) actor, model and singer
Terry Serpico (born 1964) Italian paternal grandfather
Matt Servitto (born 1965) Italian father and Irish mother – television actor (The Sopranos)
Brooke Shields (born 1965) 12.5% Italian ancestry – film actress
Mira Sorvino (born 1967) Italian father and Anglo-American mother – Academy Award-winning actress, daughter of Paul Sorvino
Vincent Spano (born 1962) film actor (Brooklyn State of Mind)
Gwen Stefani (born 1969) Italian father and part Irish mother – singer, fashion designer and actress
Quentin Tarantino (born 1963) part Italian – film director and actor (Pulp Fiction)
Marisa Tomei (born 1964) Academy Award-winning film actress (My Cousin Vinny)
Robert Torti (born 1961) actor, best known for playing roles in Andrew Lloyd Webber's musicals including Pharaoh in Joseph and the Amazing Technicolor Dreamcoat
Christine Tucci (born 1967) actress, sister of Stanley Tucci (Another World)
Stanley Tucci (born 1960) film/television actor (Shall We Dance)
Paige Turco (born 1965) actress (Person of Interest)
Aida Turturro (born 1962) actress, cousin of John Turturro (The Sopranos)
Nicholas Turturro (born 1962) film actor, brother of John Turturro (Jungle Fever, The Longest Yard)
Lenny Venito (born 1968) film/television actor (The Sopranos)
John Ventimiglia (born 1963) television actor (The Sopranos)
Kate Walsh (born 1967) Italian mother
Lisa Ann Walter (born 1963) Italian mother
Dean Winters (born 1964) mother of Italian descent and father of Irish descent - character actor (Winter of Frozen Dreams)

1970s
Donna Adamo (born 1970) wrestler and actress (The Sopranos)
Sasha Alexander (born 1973) television actress (NCIS, Rizzoli & Isles)
Victor Alfieri (born 1971) Italian-born television actor
Chad Allen (Lazzari) (born 1974) Italian father and Anglo-American mother – film/television actor (Dr. Quinn, Medicine Woman)
Lauren Ambrose (D'Ambruoso) (born 1978) father of Italian descent and mother of German, Irish, and English descent – film/television actress (Six Feet Under)
Lisa Ann (Corpora) (born 1972) of Italian and French descent – adult actress
Leila Arcieri (born 1973) Italian father and African-American mother – actress and model
Billie Joe Armstrong (born 1972) Italian great-great-grandparents
Morena Baccarin (born 1979) Brazilian-American actress
Sara Bareilles (born 1979) of Italian, German, Portuguese, and French descent
Jason Biggs (born 1978) father of English and Italian descent, mother of Italian descent – film and television actor (American Pie)
Mike Birbiglia (born 1978) comedian, actor, and filmmaker of part Italian descent
Danielle Bisutti (born 1976) actress and singer of Italian descent (True Jackson, VP)
Michelle Borth (born 1978) mother of Italian descent - actress (Wonderland)
Lara Flynn Boyle (born 1970) actress
Cara Buono (born 1974) television actress (The Sopranos)
Eddie Cahill (born 1978) Italian mother and Irish father – film/television actor (Miracle, CSI: NY)
Bobby Cannavale (born 1971) Italian-American father and Cuban mother – film/television actor (Third Watch)
Linda Cardellini (born 1975) part Italian ancestry – actress
James Carpinello (born 1975) of Italian, Danish, German and Irish descent - actor (Gangster Squad)
Tracee Chimo (born 1979) mother of Irish and Italian descent
Rhys Coiro (born 1979) father of Italian descent - film actor (Straw Dogs)
Jessica Collins (Capogna) (born 1971) film actress (The Young and the Restless)
 Marcus Coloma (born 1978) American actor of Italian and Hawaiian descent
Mark Consuelos (born 1971) Mexican father and Italian mother
Rachael Leigh Cook (born 1979) Italian mother and Anglo-American father – film actress (She's All That)
Bradley Cooper (born 1975) mother of Italian ancestry and father of Irish ancestry – film actor (The Hangover)
Sofia Coppola (born 1971) Italian father – director, actress, and Academy Award-winning screenwriter, daughter of Francis Ford Coppola
Charlie Day (born 1976) father is of Italian and Irish descent
David DeLuise (born 1971) Italian father and Italian-German mother – television/film actor (Robin Hood: Men In Tights, Wizards of Waverly Place)
Drea de Matteo (born 1972) Emmy-winning actress (The Sopranos)
 Wanda D'Isidoro (born 1977) Venezuelan actress, born in Boston
Leonardo DiCaprio (born 1974) paternal grandfather of Italian ancestry – Academy Award winner (Titanic)
Jennifer Esposito (born 1973) film/television actress (Spin City)
Peter Facinelli (born 1973) film/television actor
Ben Falcone (born 1973) of Italian, English, German and Irish descent
Joey Fatone (born 1977) pop singer and actor ('N Sync, My Big Fat Greek Wedding)
Vanessa Ferlito (born 1977) actress (CSI: NY)
Jerry Ferrara (born 1979) television actor (Entourage)
Johnny Galecki (born 1975) of Polish, Irish, and Italian descent
Carla Gallo (Paolina) (born 1975) of Italian and Greek descent - actress (Spanking the Monkey)
Jennifer Gareis (born 1970) of part Italian descent – actress (The Young and the Restless, The Bold and the Beautiful)
Luciano Giancarlo (1972–2007)
Debbie Gibson (born 1970) of Italian, German and possibly Russian descent
Aria Giovanni (born 1973) Italian-Yugoslavian father and French-German-Irish-West Indian mother — nude model and actress
Joy Giovanni (born 1978) actress and former WWE wrestler
Carmine Giovinazzo (born 1973) of partial Italian descent – film/television actor (CSI: NY)
Teresa Giudice (born 1972) actress
Lola Glaudini (born 1971) actress
Justin Guarini (born 1978) Italian-American mother
Carla Gugino (born 1971) father of Italian ancestry – film actress
Lindsay Hartley (born 1978) Jewish father and mother of Greek and Italian descent – soap opera actress (Passions)
Liza Huber (born 1975) maternal grandfather of Italian ancestry
Kate Hudson (born 1979) paternal grandmother of Italian ancestry – film actress (Almost Famous)
Jenna Jameson (Massoli) (born 1974)  paternal grandfather of Italian ancestry – model and adult actress
Bianca Kajlich (born 1977) mother of half Italian descent
Alicia Lagano (born 1979) of Italian and Irish descent - actress (Albino Farm)
Vincent Laresca (born 1974) of Italian and Panamanian descent - actor (Cop Land)
Joey Lawrence (born 1976) of part Italian descent
Natasha Leggero (born 1974) of Italian descent
Joe Lo Truglio (born 1970) Irish-Italian
Domenick Lombardozzi (born 1976) of Italian heritage – actor
Justin Long (born 1978) paternal grandmother of Italian ancestry – film/television actor (Jeepers Creepers)
Gina Lynn (born 1974) of Italian and Dutch descent – adult actress
Sam Maccarone (born 1975) star in National Lampoon's TV: The Movie.
Joe Manganiello (born 1976) Italian father and Austrian-Armenian mother – movie and TV actor
Mike Maronna (born 1977) actor (Home Alone)
Chris Messina (born 1974) actor (Damages)
Alyssa Milano (born 1972) actress (Charmed, Who's the Boss?)
Marisa Miller (Bertetta) (born 1978) paternal great-grandfather of Italian descent — model and actress
Kelly Monaco (born 1976) model and actress (General Hospital)
Brittany Murphy (Bertolotti) (1977–2009) father of Italian ancestry – film actress
Alessandro Nivola (born 1972) Italian paternal grandfather and Jewish paternal grandmother; his father was born in Italy – film actor (Face/Off, Goal!)
Annie Parisse (born 1975) Italian ancestry on father's side
Lana Parrilla (born 1977) mother is of Italian descent
Steven Pasquale (born 1976) film and TV series actor
Chelsea Peretti (born 1978) father is Italian-American
Gabriella Pession (born 1977) born in the US of Italian parents
Gina Philips (born 1970) Italian father
Justin Possenti  (born 1973) Italian father and European Jewish  mother
Zachary Quinto (born 1977) Italian father and Irish mother – film/television actor (Heroes, 24, Star Trek)
Stephen Rannazzisi (born 1977) of Italian and Irish descent
Tara Reid (born 1975) part Italian ancestry
Leah Remini (born 1970) Italian father and Jewish mother – film/television actress (The King Of Queens)
Giovanni Ribisi (born 1974) 25% Italian ancestry – film/television actor (Avatar, Gone in 60 Seconds, Saving Private Ryan)
Marissa Ribisi (born 1974) twin sister of actor Giovanni Ribisi
Kelly Ripa (born 1970) 75% Italian and 25% Irish – actress (All My Children, Live with Regis and Kelly)
Elisabeth Röhm (born 1973) Italian maternal grandfather
Jai Rodriguez (born 1979) Italian mother and Puerto Rican father – actor and culture guide (Queer Eye for the Straight Guy)
Antonio Sabato Jr. (born 1972) Italian father and Czech and Jewish mother – Italian born actor
Jennifer Sciole (born 1979) of Italian descent - actress (Tin Cup)
Adam Scott (born 1973) of Italian descent on his mother's side
Vinessa Shaw (born 1976) of Jewish, English, Irish, German, Mexican, Italian, and Swedish ancestry - film actress and model (Eyes Wide Shut)
Sage Stallone (1976–2012) 25% Italian ancestry – film actor and son of Sylvester Stallone
Jennifer Taylor (Bini) (born 1972) of Italian descent - actress (Wild Things)
Jonathan Togo (born 1977) 25% Italian ancestry – film/television actor (CSI: Miami)
Liv Tyler (Tallarico) (born 1977) paternal great-grandfather of Italian ancestry – actress (Stealing Beauty)
Mia Tyler (Tallarico) (born 1978) paternal half-sister of actress Liv Tyler
Amber Valletta (born 1974) paternal grandfather of Italian descent – actress (Revenge, Legends)
Vince Vaughn (born 1970) of English, Irish, German, Italian, and Lebanese ancestry
Milo Ventimiglia (born 1977) father is of Italian descent – actor/producer (Heroes)
Cerina Vincent (born 1979) Irish-Italian father, Italian mother – nude model and actress (Not Another Teen Movie)
John Lloyd Young (born 1975) mother of Italian ancestry – theater/film actor, Tony Award winner (Jersey Boys)

1980s
Eva Amurri (born 1985) father and maternal grandmother of Italian ancestry – film/television actress, daughter of Susan Sarandon
Michael Angarano (born 1987) television/film actor (Sky High, Will & Grace)
A.J. Applegate (born 1989) of Italian and German descent
Justin Baldoni (born 1984) Italian father and Jewish mother – television actor (Everwood)
Paul Barresi (born 1949) US Air Force Vietnam war era veteran of Italian ancestry - film/stage/television actor 
Adrian Bellani (Celasco) (born 1982) Salvadoran mother and Italian father – television actor (Passions)
Troian Bellisario (born 1985) father is of half Italian and half Serbian descent
Rachel Bilson (born 1981) Italian mother and Jewish father – film/television actress (The O.C.)
Thora Birch (born 1982) actress and producer of mixed German-Jewish, French-Canadian, Scandinavian and Italian descent (Affairs of State)
Corbin Bleu (born 1989) Italian mother and Jamaican father – film/television actor (High School Musical)
Sophia Bush (born 1982) part Italian – television actress (One Tree Hill)
Ashley Lyn Cafagna (born 1983) 25% Italian ancestry – soap opera actress turned film star and singer
Francis Capra (born 1983) Italian and Dominican descent
Gina Carano (born 1982) Italian descent – former MMA fighter and actress
Robert Carmine (Schwartzman) (born 1982) Italian mother and Jewish father – film actor, son of Talia Shire
Aya Cash (born 1982) mother of Italian descent
Loan Chabanol (born 1982)
Lacey Chabert (born 1982) father is of 1/4 Italian descent
Hayden Christensen (born 1981) maternal grandmother is of Italian descent – actor (Awake)
Stephen Colletti (born 1986) 25% Italian – reality television star and co-host of MTV's TRL
Mark Copani (born 1981) Italian father and Jordanian mother – actor and professional wrestler
Genevieve Cortese (born 1981) has Italian, French and Flemish ancestry
Kaley Cuoco (born 1985) father of Italian ancestry – television actress (8 Simple Rules, Charmed, The Big Bang Theory)
Alexandra Daddario (born 1986) actress of mixed English, Hungarian, Irish, Slovak and Italian descent
Matthew Daddario (born 1987) actor of mixed English, Hungarian, Slovak, Irish and Italian descent
Nicholas D'Agosto (born 1980) father of Italian ancestry – television actor
Caroline D'Amore (born 1985) Italian ancestry on her father's side
Majandra Delfino (born 1981) father of Italian descent (Roswell)
Lucy DeVito (born 1983) daughter of Danny DeVito
Torrey DeVitto (born 1984) daughter of Liberty DeVitto
Jessica DiCicco (born 1980) Italian father (Bobby DiCicco) – voice actress
Tiffany Dupont (born 1981) Italian father - actress
Alexis Dziena (born 1984) has Irish, Italian and Polish ancestry (Invasion)  
Cameron Esposito (born 1981) Italian-American parents
Chris Evans (born 1981) maternal grandfather of Italian ancestry – film actor (The Avengers, Fantastic Four)
Briana Evigan (born 1986) maternal grandfather was of Italian ancestry (Step Up 2: The Streets)
Jack Falahee (John Ryan Falahee) (born 1989) of Italian and Irish descent - actor and singer (Cardboard Boxer)
Santino Fontana (born 1982) half Italian, 1/4 Spanish, 1/4 Portuguese (Frozen, Crazy Ex-Girlfriend)
Farrah Franklin (born 1981) Italian and African-American
Alberto Frezza (born 1989) Italian-American actor (Station 19)
David Giuntoli (born 1980) is an actor of Italian (father) and Polish and German (mother) descent
Presley Hart (born 1988) has Italian descent
Shelley Hennig (born 1987) mother of Italian descent – film/television actress (Teen Wolf)
David Henrie (born 1989) maternal grandparents were Italian – television actor (How I Met Your Mother, Wizards of Waverly Place)
Vanessa Hessler (born 1988) mother of Italian ancestry
Paris Hilton (born 1981) Italian great-grandfather – television/film actress (House of Wax)
Brooke Hogan (born 1988) paternal grandfather of Italian ancestry
Paul Iacono (born 1988) Italian-American parents
Jonas Brothers (Kevin, Joe and Nick), 12.5% Italian ancestry – singers/actors (Jonas L.A and Jonas Brothers)
Ellie Kemper (born 1980) Italian from her maternal grandfather, along with English, French, and German ancestry
Lady Gaga (Stefani Germanotta) (born 1986) 75% Italian ancestry – singer performer (The Fame Monster, Born This Way)
Chloe Rose Lattanzi (born 1986) paternal grandfather of Italian descent – film actress, daughter of Matt Lattanzi
Katrina Law (born 1985) has German, Taiwanese and Italian ancestry – television/film actress (Spartacus: Blood and Sand)
Andrew Lawrence (born 1988) brother of Joey Lawrence
Matthew Lawrence (born 1980) brother of Joey Lawrence
Floriana Lima (born 1981) of Italian, Irish, English, Spanish and Portuguese descent
Lindsay Lohan (born 1986) Irish and Italian ancestry – television/film actress (The Parent Trap, Mean Girls)
Michelle Lombardo (born 1983) Italian father and Irish mother – actress and model
Shannon Lucio (born 1980) Italian ancestry
Brooke Lyons (born 1980) has Italian, Irish and Portuguese descent
John Magaro (born 1983) Italian father and Jewish mother - actor (Lansky)
Tina Majorino (born 1985) 25% Italian ancestry – film/television actress (Napoleon Dynamite, Veronica Mars)
Kate Mara (born 1983) maternal grandmother of Italian descent (House of Cards)
Rooney Mara (born 1985) maternal grandmother of Italian descent (The Girl with the Dragon Tattoo)
Phoenix Marie (born 1981) Italian descent – adult film actress
Joseph Mazzello (born 1983) 3/8ths Italian ancestry, along with German Jewish, Polish, and Irish
Gregory Michael (born 1981) mother of Italian ancestry, father of English, Irish, German, French ancestry. (Dante's Cove, As the World Turns, Greek)
Lea Michele (born 1986) Sephardic Jewish father and Italian Catholic mother; Michele was raised Catholic – (Glee)
Kate Micucci (born 1980) Italian ancestry
Cristin Milioti (born 1985) Italian father (How I Met Your Mother)
Vanessa Minnillo (born 1980) 25% Italian – actress
Frankie Muniz (born 1985) Italian and Irish mother and Puerto Rican father – film actor (Agent Cody Banks, Malcolm in the Middle)
Rachel Nichols (born 1980) 3/16ths Italian descent (through her mother)
Dawn Olivieri (born 1981) Italian ancestry
Stacie Orrico (born 1986) Italian ancestry
Olivia Palermo (born 1986) father of Italian descent – actress
Aleksa Palladino (born 1980) Italian ancestry
Hayden Panettiere (born 1989) part Italian – model and television/film actress (Heroes)
Rosanna Pansino (born 1985) has Italian, Croatian, German, and Irish ancestry
Audrina Patridge (born 1985) part Italian ancestry
Charlie Pecoraro (born 1980) Italian-American – film/stage actor
Joseph Perrino (born 1982) film/television actor (The Sopranos) 
Michael Pitt (born 1981) mother is of Italian ancestry
Shawn Pyfrom (born 1986) 12.5% Italian ancestry – television/film actor (Desperate Housewives)
Nikki Reed (born 1988) Jewish father, mother of 1/4 Italian descent – actress
Christina Ricci (born 1980) father of half Italian ancestry – film actress (The Addams Family)
Italia Ricci (born 1986) Canadian-American actress
Amanda Righetti (born 1983) part Italian ancestry – film actress and producer
Amber Rose (born 1983) has Italian, Cape Verdean, Irish and Scottish ancestry
Dylan Ryder (born 1981) adult film actress of Italian and German descent
Peter Scanavino (born 1980) of Italian descent - actor (Zenith)
Jason Schwartzman (born 1980) Jewish father and Italian mother – film actor, son of Talia Shire (Rushmore)
Alia Shawkat (born 1989) mother is of Norwegian, Irish, and Italian descent
The Situation (born 1981) television personality and actor
Marina Squerciati (born 1984) of Italian descent
Bobbi Starr (born 1983) Italian and Hungarian ancestry
Julia Stiles (O'Hara) (born 1981) father is of Irish descent and mother is of Italian and English descent - actress (Save the Last Dance)
Steven Strait (born 1986) father is of English descent and mother is of Italian descent — model, singer, and actor (Sky High, Magic City)
Brooklyn Sudano (born 1981) Italian father
Taryn Thomas (born 1983) Italian ancestry
Daya Vaidya (born 1980) Indian Gujarati father and Italian/Spanish-American mother - actress (Leprechaun in the Hood)
Arielle Vandenberg (born 1981) Italian and Dutch descent
Kate Voegele (born 1986) Italian ancestry
Dreama Walker (born 1986) mother is of Italian descent - actress (Once Upon a Time in Hollywood)
Casey Wilson (born 1980) Irish and Italian heritage

1990s
Annabelle Attanasio (born 1993) father is of Italian descent
Sofia Black-D'Elia (born 1991) father is of Italian descent and mother is Jewish
Jake Cannavale (born 1995) Italian grandfather
Raquel Castro (born 1994) father is of Puerto Rican descent and mother is of Italian and Jewish descent - actress and singer (Jersey Girl)
Noah Centineo (born 1996) actor (father of Italian descent)
Michael Cimino (born 1999) of Italian-German and Puerto Rican descent
Pete Davidson (born 1993) actor and comedian (Saturday Night Live)
Ariana DeBose (born 1991) Italian-Puerto Rican father
Julia Fox (born 1990) Italian mother
Seychelle Gabriel (born 1991) father is of Mexican and French descent while mother is of Italian ancestry
Leila George (born 1992) both parents (Vincent D'Onofrio and Greta Scacchi) are of Italian descent
Elizabeth Gillies (born 1993) Italian grandmother — television and Broadway actress/singer (Victorious)
Selena Gomez (born 1992) mother of Italian descent
Ariana Grande (born 1993) television and Broadway actress/singer (Victorious)
Willa Holland (born 1991) mother is of Italian descent – actress and model (Arrow)
Rosabell Laurenti Sellers (born 1996) Italian father – actress (Game of Thrones)
Liana Liberato (born 1995) of Italian, Czech, English, French and Irish descent
Ali Lohan (born 1993) part Irish and part Italian – television actress, musician
Caitlyn Taylor Love (born 1994) of Irish and Italian descent – television/film actress (I'm in the Band)
Matilda Lutz (born 1991) mother is of Italian descent - actress 
Ryan Malgarini (born 1992) 25% Italian ancestry – film actor (Freaky Friday)
Gia Mantegna (born 1990) daughter of Joe Mantegna who is of Italian descent – television actress (Unaccompanied Minors)
Laura Marano (born 1995) father is of Italian descent – television actress (Austin & Ally)
Vanessa Marano (born 1992) father is of Italian descent – television actress (Switched at Birth; Without a Trace; The Young and the Restless)
Vincent Martella (born 1992) television actor (Everybody Hates Chris; Phineas and Ferb)
Chris Massoglia (born 1992) television and motion picture actor (great-grandfather of Italian descent)
Julianna Rose Mauriello (born 1991) Italian father
Jennette McCurdy (born 1992) great-grandparent of Italian descent — actress (iCarly)
Mitchel Musso (born 1991) of 3/8ths Italian ancestry – television actor (Hannah Montana)
Dylan O'Brien (born 1991) of partial Italian descent – film/television actor (Teen Wolf; The Maze Runner)
Jansen Panettiere (born 1994) part Italian – television actor (Tiger Cruise)
Victoria Pedretti (born 1995) three-quarter Italian father
Madison Pettis (born 1998) her mother is of French, Irish and Italian descent (Cory in the House, Life with Boys)
Grace Rolek (born 1997) of African-American, Italian, Polish and Japanese descent
Bonnie Rotten (born 1993) of Italian, German, Polish and Jewish descent – adult actress
Cassie Scerbo (born 1990) full Italian ancestry
Christian Serratos (born 1990) father is of Italian descent – film/television actress (Ned's Declassified School Survival Guide; The Walking Dead)
Bella Thorne (born 1997) Cuban, Irish, and Italian descent (Shake it Up)

2000s
Thomas Barbusca (born 2003)
Francesca Capaldi (born 2004)
Mattea Conforti (born 2006)
Isabella Crovetti (born 2004)
Daniel DiMaggio (born 2003)
Jacob Hopkins (born 2002)
Annie LeBlanc (born 2004) mother of Italian descent
Gaten Matarazzo (born 2002)
August Maturo (born 2007)
Jack Messina (born 2007)
Addison Riecke (born 2004) of Italian descent
Keidrich Sellati (born 2001)
JoJo Siwa (born 2003)
Mina Sundwall (born 2001) mother of Italian descent

Adopted heritage
Laura Benanti (born 1979) American actress, stepfather is of Italian descent. She is of Yugoslavian-German-Irish-Native American heritage.
Lillo Brancato (born 1976) Colombian-born American actor, adopted son of Italian-American parents.
Ray Liotta (1954-2022) film actor, adopted son of Italian-American father. He stated that he was not of Italian descent.
Roma Maffia (born 1958) American actress, stepfather is of Italian descent. She is of West Indian, English and German descent.
Heather Matarazzo (born 1982) American actress, adopted daughter of Italian-American parents.
Nicole "Snooki" Polizzi (born 1987) Chilean-born American reality star actress, adopted daughter of Italian-American parents.
Theresa Saldana (1954-2016) American actress, adopted daughter of Italian-American father.

Voice actors
Joe Bevilacqua (born 1959) award-winning voice actor, radio producer, dramatist, humorist, and documentarian
Candy Candido (1913–1999) long-time comedian and Disney voice actor (Peter Pan, Robin Hood, and The Great Mouse Detective), also appeared in the Ralph Bakshi movies Hey Good Lookin' and Heavy Traffic
Dan Castellaneta (born 1957) best known for Homer Simpson in The Simpsons
Vic Mignogna (born 1962) best known as Edward Elric in Fullmetal Alchemist: Brotherhood
Fred Tatasciore (born 1967), part Italian

See also
List of Italian American entertainers
List of Italian Americans
List of Italian-American television characters

References 
Peter Bogdanella, Hollywood Italians: Dagos, Palookas, Romeos, Wise Guys, and Sopranos, New York: The Continuum IPG, 2004 – 
Victoria Thomas, Hollywood's Latin Lovers: Latino, Italian, and French Men Who Make the Screen Smolder, Santa Monica: Angel City Press, 1998 –

Footnotes

Actors
Actors
Lists of actors by ethnicity
Lists of American actors
American actors by ethnic or national origin